Crying Is Not Enough is a survival horror action-adventure video game developed and published by Greek indie developers Akis Olsey Mila and Konstantinos Poulis under the collective name of "Storyline Team". The story follows 35-year-old Jacob Helten as he tries to unravel the mystery of his wife's disappearance after a horrific car accident. The game was developed over the course of five years, and was eventually released on Steam on 15 June 2018.

Gameplay
The player controls the protagonist, Jacob Helten, from a third-person perspective, and has to traverse through a bizarre, death-filled world that is home to grotesque monsters. Players use firearms in order to defeat enemies, reminiscent of the Silent Hill series of games. Apart from gathering weapons and battling the mutated patients inhabiting the island, players are also tasked with solving Resident Evil-style puzzles.

Plot
The game tells the story of a 35 year-old man named Jacob Helten, whose wife Claire is being treated in a hospital after suffering a serious injury in a car accident. As Claire's health continuously improves over the next few weeks, and she is about to get discharged, she vanishes from the hospital. Following his wife's disappearance, Jacob is approached by an unknown elderly woman, who claims to have knowledge of Claire's whereabouts and offers to help Jacob find her.

Jacob boards a helicopter on the roof of the hospital and soon finds himself on a mysterious distant island filled with nightmarish creatures and toxic waste. He is faced with a series of puzzles to solve in order to make progress and slowly uncovers a far darker plot, filled with hatred, fear and intrigue.

Development
The game began pre-alpha in 2013, when two friends, Akis Olsey Mila and Konstantinos Poulis set out to create their own video game. At the end of the year they had their game cleared the Steam Greenlight process.

In 2015, due to the developers' limited resources and disappointing pre-alpha test results, Mila and Poulis, decided to keep up with the technological requirements of the latest generation consoles, starting the entire development from scratch. The game was eventually released on Steam in June 2018. Reportedly, PlayStation 4 and Xbox One versions were being planned for release on the third quarter of 2018, but have since received no official release date.

Crying Is Not Enough: Remastered
On 12 April 2019, a massive update was released, essentially replacing the original game with a Remastered version. Crying Is Not Enough: Remastered fixed many of the bugs and softlocks reported by players following the game's launch in 2018, while also adding new sound effects, textures and changes in the core game code. The update further featured a redesign of the game's aiming system, UI and controller movement, while also improving the enemies' behavior. Many of the original game's loading screens were removed, while improvements were made to the ones remaining. The game's cutscenes were also remastered, while an option to skip cinematics was implemented. Finally, Remastered redesigned the game's save system, fixing known bugs.

Reception
Reception for Crying Is Not Enough has been mixed. The game was well received in its home country, where it received the "People's Choice Award" during the Athens Games Festival, as well as being voted as "Greek Game of the Year" by Greek media and entertainment website GameWorld.gr users in its annual Game of the Year Awards 2018. On the other hand, it received mostly negative reviews upon its release on Steam, while American YouTuber Angry Joe listed Crying Is Not Enough at third place in his "Worst Games of 2018" list.

After the release of the Remastered update, the game currently has a "mixed" rating on Steam.

Accolades

References

External links
 

2018 video games
2010s horror video games
Action-adventure games
Single-player video games
Video games developed in Greece
Steam Greenlight games
Indie video games
Windows games